Elizaveta Sidorenko (born 18 March 2003) is a Russian Paralympic swimmer. She represented Russian Paralympic Committee athletes at the 2020 Summer Paralympics.

Paralympics
Sidorenko represented Russian Paralympic Committee athletes at the 2020 Summer Paralympics and won a silver medal in the women's 4×100 metre medley relay 34pts event.

References

2003 births
Living people
Paralympic swimmers of Russia
Swimmers at the 2020 Summer Paralympics
Medalists at the 2020 Summer Paralympics
Paralympic medalists in swimming
Paralympic silver medalists for the Russian Paralympic Committee athletes
S10-classified Paralympic swimmers
21st-century Russian women